{{DISPLAYTITLE:C13H18O7}}
The molecular formula C13H18O7 (molar mass : 286.28 g/mol, react mass : 286.105253 u) may refer to : 
 Gastrodin, a natural polyphenol found in the orchid Gastrodia elata
 Salicin, a natural polyphenol found in willow